Yamethin Township is a township of Yamethin District in the Mandalay Region of Burma (Myanmar). The administrative seat and principal city is Yamethin, which is also the major rail stop in the township, and it has a population of 258,091.

Communities
Among the many communities in Yamethin Township are: North and South Pyar Si, Upper and Lower Warpyutaung (Wapyudaung), and Yebyu.

Food 
Yamethin is known for its fried Tofu, grape plantation, and high production of several crops and paddy.

Kyini Lake
It was dug by King Kyawswa of Bagan in 1303 A.D. It was restored in 2015 to irrigate 8129 acres of monsoon and summer paddy plantations and provide water to the people of nearby areas.

History
Yamethin Township was established as a town during the time of King Duttabaung in 170 BE (Buddhist Era). The town was formerly known as Nwamethin (နွားမည်းသင်း), in reference to the preponderance of black cows in the area. Over time, the town's name evolved to Namethin and to Yamethin, which is the modern-day name.

Climate

Demographics

2014

The 2014 Myanmar Census reported that Yamethin Township had a population of 258,091. The population density was 119.1 people per km². The census reported that the median age was 28.4 years, and a sex ratio of 95 males per 100 females. There were 57,259 households; the mean household size was 4.1.

References

External links

 "Yamethin Township - Mandalay Division" Map ID: MIMU 154v01, Creation Date: 17 May 2010, Myanmar Information Management Unit (MIMU)
 Township 151 on "Myanmar States/Divisions & Townships Overview Map" Myanmar Information Management Unit (MIMU)
 "Yamethin Google Satellite Map" Maplandia

Townships of Mandalay Region